Yessica Salazar (born Yessica Salazar González on December 28, 1973 in Guadalajara, Jalisco, Mexico) is a Mexican actress and model. She participated in Nuestra Belleza México and obtained the title of Miss Mexico World.

She represented her country in the 1996 Miss World pageant, placing among the semi-finalists in Bangalore, India on November 22, 1996. During the pageant, Yessica was also awarded the title of Miss Spectacular Beach Wear. She later began her career as an actress, making her debut in the Mexican telenovela La usurpadora.

Filmography

References

External links

1973 births
Living people
Mexican telenovela actresses
Mexican television actresses
Mexican film actresses
Mexican female models
Miss World 1996 delegates
Nuestra Belleza México winners
Actresses from Guadalajara, Jalisco
20th-century Mexican actresses
21st-century Mexican actresses
People from Guadalajara, Jalisco